Dominik Windisch (born 6 November 1989) is an Italian biathlete.

Career
He competed in the Sochi 2014 Winter Olympics for Italy, where he finished 11th in the Sprint and won a bronze in the Mixed relay (together with Karin Oberhofer, Dorothea Wierer and Lukas Hofer).

At the Pyeongchang 2018 Winter Olympics he took the bronze medal in the sprint and as well the mixed relay.

His brother Markus Windisch is a former biathlete.

Biathlon results
All results are sourced from the International Biathlon Union.

Olympic Games
3 medals (3 bronze medals)

*The mixed relay was added as an event in 2014.

World Championships
3 medals (1 gold, 1 silver, 1 bronze)

*During Olympic seasons competitions are only held for those events not included in the Olympic program.
**The single mixed relay was added as an event in 2019.

References

External links
 
 
 

1989 births
Living people
Italian male biathletes
Olympic biathletes of Italy
Olympic bronze medalists for Italy
Olympic medalists in biathlon
Biathletes at the 2014 Winter Olympics
Biathletes at the 2018 Winter Olympics
Biathletes at the 2022 Winter Olympics
Medalists at the 2014 Winter Olympics
Medalists at the 2018 Winter Olympics
Biathlon World Championships medalists
Cross-country skiers of Gruppo Sportivo Esercito
Sportspeople from Bruneck
Germanophone Italian people